Anopina salvadorana is a species of moth of the family Tortricidae. It is found in El Salvador.

References

Moths described in 2000
salvadorana
Moths of Central America